The Three Books of Rites, is a collective name for three Confucian books the Etiquette and Ceremonial, the Rites of Zhou, and the Book of Rites. The name was coined by Zheng Xuan in the Eastern Han.

In the early years of the Western Han "Book of Rites" was originally a term for the Etiquette and Ceremonial, but the Eastern Han Zheng Xuan included the Etiquette and Ceremonial, the Book of Rites, and the Rites of Zhou as the Three Ritual Classics, and wrote a commentary on the Three Ritual Classics, the Tang dynasty The "Book of Rites" was called "Xiaodai Liji" in the Tang dynasty, and later people gradually called the "Book of Rites" as "Three Ritual Classics".

The Three Ritual Classics have always been difficult to read, their language is archaic, their text is brief, and they are known to be difficult to understand, For example, many of the architectural structures and scales of the palaces in the Book of Rites have not been covered, and they have been "repeatedly changed over the ages, gradually becoming different from the old", so that when reading the Rites, the palaces of the Son of Heaven and Lords are often imagined to be a castle in the sky.

References

延伸阅读 
  《欽定古今圖書集成·理學彙編·經籍典·三禮部》，出自蒋廷锡《古今圖書集成》
Chinese Classical Studies